Narlı is a village in the Laçin District of Çorum Province in Turkey. Its population is 593 (2022). Before the 2013 reorganisation, it was a town (belde).

References

Villages in Laçin District